The 1919 Saxe-Weimar-Eisenach state election was held on 9 March 1919 to elect the 42 members of the Landtag of Saxe-Weimar-Eisenach.

Results

References 

Saxe-Weimar-Eisenach
Elections in Thuringia